Muncitorul Reșița was a Romanian professional football club from Reșița, Caraș-Severin County, Romania, founded in 1911 and dissolved in 2017.

History
The club promoted to the Liga III at the end of the 2004–05 season, after a very long time, but the joy was short, because it relegated after only one season.

After three seasons in fourth division, in which he finished each time in second place, Muncitorul, returns to Liga III by FRF decision to fill the vacant seats, but it relegated again.

It promoted back to the Liga III in the summer of 2012. It finished 7th in the 2012–13 season.

Gospodarii finished 2016–17 Liga IV season on the 11th place, but in the summer of 2017 the club didn't enrolled the senior team in any league, due to financial problems.

Chronology of names

Honours
Liga IV – Caraș-Severin County
Winners (3): 2004–05, 2011–12
Runners-up (3): 2006–07, 2007–08, 2008–09

References

Association football clubs established in 1911
Association football clubs disestablished in 2017
Defunct football clubs in Romania
Football clubs in Caraș-Severin County
Liga II clubs
Liga III clubs
Liga IV clubs
1911 establishments in Austria-Hungary
2017 disestablishments in Romania